Michael Douglas Crisp (born 1950) is an emeritus professor in the Research School of Biology at the Australian National University located in Canberra. In 1976 he gained a PhD from the University of Adelaide, studying long-term vegetation changes in arid zones of South Australia. In 2020 Professor Crisp moved to Brisbane where he has an honorary position at the University of Queensland. Together with others he  has revised various pea-flowered legume genera (Daviesia, Gastrolobium, Gompholobium, Pultenaea and Jacksonia). 

He has made considerable contributions to  biogeography, phylogeny and plant evolution.

Some taxa authored
See :Category:Taxa named by Michael Crisp

References

1950 births
Living people
University of Adelaide alumni
Academic staff of the Australian National University
Australian Botanical Liaison Officers